Severe Tropical Cyclone Tomas was the most intense tropical cyclone to strike Fiji since Cyclone Bebe in 1972. Forming out of a tropical disturbance on March 9, 2010, designated 14F by the Fiji Meteorological Service, the system gradually organized within an environment favoring intensification. By March 11, the disturbance had strengthened sufficiently to be classified as Tropical Cyclone Tomas, the eighth named storm of the 2009–10 South Pacific cyclone season. Modest intensification took place over the following few days, with the system attaining severe tropical cyclone status on March 13. On March 14, Tomas began to impact parts of Fiji while continuing to gain strength.

Cyclone Tomas proved to be very destructive throughout Fiji, leaving many homeless and entire villages under water. At least one person has been confirmed to have been killed by the storm after being swept out to sea while rescuing family members.

Meteorological history

Shortly after the first advisory on Tropical Disturbance 13F was issued on March 9, the Fiji Meteorological Service (FMS) began monitoring a new disturbance, designated 14F, further east. The following day, deep convection began to develop around the disturbance's low-level circulation, prompting the JTWC to begin monitoring it for possible cyclonic development. Later on March 10, the FMS upgraded the system to a tropical depression as it continued to become better organized. Located within an environment characterized by low wind shear, further intensification was anticipated as convection continued to develop over the expanding system. Around 1500 UTC on March 11, the JTWC issued their first advisory on the cyclone, classifying it as Tropical Storm 19P. Several hours later, the FMS upgraded the system to a Category 1 cyclone and gave it the name Tomas. Rapid intensification was expected to take place over the following 48 hours as sea surface temperatures ahead of the storm averaged , well-above the threshold for tropical cyclone development.

Convective banding substantially increased on March 13, allowing Tomas to become the fourth severe tropical cyclone of the season early the next morning. By the afternoon of March 14, Tomas had developed a banding-eye feature surrounded by deep convection. The JTWC also noted further intensification, upgrading Tomas to a Category 3 equivalent storm.

Impact
One person was killed on Vanua Levu after being swept out to sea by large swells while trying to rescue her two sisters, a niece and a nephew near Namilamila Bay.

In the northernmost islands of Fiji, communication with Cikobia and Qelelevu was lost on March 15 as the cyclone passed through the region. Officials feared that severe damage and loss of life occurred on the island. Many homes along rivers and the Pacific were washed away by rising waters and tides exceeding . Power and running water was disrupted to numerous islands, forcing thousands to seek shelter. During the initial assessment of damage, at least 50 homes were confirmed to have been destroyed by Tomas. This prompted Fijian officials to declare a State of disaster for the northern and eastern divisions of Fiji.

On its way, the cyclone has passed near Futuna island, heavily damaging an important part of houses and other buildings and cutting the water and electricity supply, but leaving no human casualties. The most severed was the north-eastern part of the island and notably the village of Poi and its surroundings. There, the islands only road was washed away and most of the houses were completely demolished by strong wind and rising waves.

After the storm, the governments of New Zealand and Australia each sent $1 million in their respective currencies to Fiji. The New Zealand Air Force sent relief supplies, including tarps and water purifying equipment.

See also

Other storms with the same name
Cyclone Pat
Cyclone Ami

References

External links

Tropical cyclones in Fiji
Category 4 South Pacific cyclones
2009–10 South Pacific cyclone season
Tropical cyclones in Wallis and Futuna
Retired South Pacific cyclones
2010 in Fiji
2010 in Wallis and Futuna
Tropical cyclones in 2010